The Taşoluk Tunnel, is a motorway tunnel constructed on the Adana–Şanlıurfa motorway    in Osmaniye Province, southern Turkey.

It is situated on the Taurus Mountains near Burgaçlı village of Bahçe, Osmaniye. The -long twin-tube tunnel carrying three lanes of traffic in each direction.  

The tunnel was constructed by Tekfen in New Austrian Tunnelling method (NATM).

See also
List of motorway tunnels in Turkey

References

External links
 Map of road tunnels in Turkey at General Directorate of Highways (Turkey) (KGM)

Road tunnels in Turkey
Transport in Osmaniye Province